Stanisława of Bogoria and Skotnik (died c. March 27, 1352) was a Polish noblewoman and member of the Bogoriowie family of the Bogorya coat of arms.

Stanisława was the daughter of Paweł of Bogoria and Skotnik. She married Spytek of Melsztyn about 1315.

Children:
Czuchna of Tarnów
Nieustąp of Tarnów
Rafał of Tarnów

References

13th-century births
1352 deaths
Stanislawa of Bogoria and Skotnik
14th-century Polish nobility